Drosophila acanthostoma is a species of fly in the genus Drosophila. It is found in Hawaii.

References 

acanthostoma
Insects described in 1968